Lambda Delta Sigma was a college sorority, although originally it was co-educational, sponsored by the Church of Jesus Christ of Latter-day Saints (LDS Church). The Greek letters in its name match LDS, the common initialization of Latter-day Saints.

History
In the early years of the Institute of Religion at the University of Utah, attendance was growing and some male students wanted a way to build their brotherhood with fellow Latter-day Saints.  Lowell L. Bennion, the institute director, helped them prepare a constitution and organized them as "Alpha House" in October 1936, followed by "Omega House" for women in December.  Shortly afterward, these houses were collectively named Lambda Delta Sigma, which would be a co-educational Greek society open to anyone willing to uphold Latter-day Saint ideals.

In 1966 following a study by Paul H. Dunn, the LDSSA was formed and Lambda Delta Sigma was dissolved.

Elaine Cannon, Winnifred Jardine, Frank Bradshaw and Alfred Nielsen were called by the general authorities to make plans for a new LDS sorority and divided the organization, making Lambda Delta Sigma a sorority and creating Sigma Gamma Chi as its fraternity. Elaine Cannon was called as the new national advisor, and wrote the Pledge Ceremony, Initiation Ceremony and selected other symbols for the group.

In November 1967, this new Lambda Delta Sigma was approved at the first National Convention of the LDSSA. In 1977, the sorority was transferred to the leadership of the Relief Society General Presidency and the national LDS President served on the General Relief Society Board and by 1982, all Lambda Delta Sigma officers gained National Board positions.

This student-run sorority is no longer in operation and has since been replaced by the LDS Student Association (LDSSA), the church's organization for college students organized under the Latter-day Saint Institutes of Religion.

See also
 Sigma Gamma Chi
 LDS Student Association

Notes

1936 establishments in Utah
Organizational subdivisions of the Church of Jesus Christ of Latter-day Saints
Young people and the Church of Jesus Christ of Latter-day Saints
The Church of Jesus Christ of Latter-day Saints in Utah
Latter Day Saint fraternities and sororities in the United States
Student organizations established in 1936
Christian organizations established in 1936
Defunct fraternities and sororities